The Zero Emission Hyper Sonic Transport or ZEHST is a planned hypersonic passenger jet airliner project by the multinational aerospace conglomerate EADS and the Japanese national space agency JAXA.

On 18 June 2011, the ZEHST concept was unveiled by EADS at the Le Bourget Air Show. The envisioned vehicle uses a combination of three different types of engines, including relatively conventional turbofans, rocket motors, and scramjets to attain a maximum speed of Mach 4.5 (four and a half times the speed of sound). The ZEHST has been projected to carry between 50 and 100 passengers while flying at very high altitudes for greater efficiency.

Conceptually, the ZEHST has been promoted as a descendant of, or a successor to, Concorde, a supersonic airliner that was withdrawn from passenger routes in 2003. According to projections released, the ZEHST would be capable of flying between Paris and Tokyo in 2.5 hours, or between New York and London within one hour. During 2011, EADS stated its prediction that the ZEHST could be flying by 2050.

Development
Even prior to the introduction of the Concorde supersonic airliner during the 1970s, there has been a desire within elements of the aviation industry to produce further high-speed transport aircraft. Since the 1990s, several collaborative research efforts in the field have been financed in Europe. By the 2010s, both the American aerospace company Boeing and the multinational aerospace conglomerate EADS were reportedly working on separate plans to develop hypersonic aircraft. Such efforts have largely been constrained to theoretical work, however some progress has been observed over the decades; innovations have continued to be patented in the field, such as for a mixed-propulsion arrangement awarded to EADS in 2010. Amongst other aspects, efforts have been made to reduce noise generated by sonic booms, which are commonly produced by aircraft operating at supersonic speeds.

On 18 June 2011, EADS revealed the Zero Emission Hyper Sonic Transport (ZEHST) concept at the Le Bourget Air Show. As originally announced, the aircraft would combine three distinct propulsion systems: two turbofan engines for taxiing/take-off and up to Mach 0.8, then rocket boosters up to Mach 2.5, before switching to a pair of underwing scramjets to accelerate up to its maximum speed of Mach 4.5 (four and a half times the speed of sound). The fuel of these engines is envisaged to be a biofuel primarily consisting of seaweed, along with a combination of oxygen and hydrogen. Largely due to this fuel composition, the aircraft has been referred to as "green" aircraft that generates "almost zero emissions".

Furthermore, ZEHST possesses an unusually high cruising altitude of 32 km above ground level, flying within the outer atmosphere (in comparison, conventional airliners cruise at around 11km above ground level); this height was principally opted for due to the air being thinner and thus generating less drag that would slow down the aircraft and decrease efficiency. The use of conventional turbofan engines during its take off phase of flight would result in the ZEHST being no more noisy than conventional airliners. While the ZEHST's configuration has not been finalised, EADS has commented that believed that Concorde's basic design remains a strong base for the project.

In addition to EADS itself, much of the propulsion-based development work on the ZEHST project had been made in cooperation with the European missile specialist MBDA and the French national aerospace research centre ONERA. International engagement has also secured partners, the cooperative HIKARI R&D project is underway between Japanese and European agencies. The ZEHST is not the only such effort that the company has engaged itself in. By 2015, Airbus Group (to which EADS had rebranded itself as) was reportedly working on two separate hypersonic projects, one in conjunction with Japanese partners and the other with Russian and Australian involvement. That same year, company chief executive Tom Enders publicly stated his enthusiasm for Airbus to complete development of a hypersonic long range passenger transport.

See also
 Supercruise
 Concorde
 Tupolev Tu-144
 SpaceLiner
 Boeing 2707
 Orient Express X-30 follow-on
 Boeing Sonic Cruiser
 HyperMach SonicStar
 Reaction Engines A2
 Skylon
 Airbus Defence and Space Spaceplane

References

External links
  with a diagram of the plane.
 .
 .
 .
 .

Hydrogen-powered aircraft
Supersonic transports
Mixed-power aircraft
Rocket-powered aircraft
International proposed aircraft
Ramjet-powered aircraft